Jeon Byeong-guk (born 23 July 1964) is a South Korean weightlifter. He competed in the men's middle heavyweight event at the 1988 Summer Olympics.

References

1964 births
Living people
South Korean male weightlifters
Olympic weightlifters of South Korea
Weightlifters at the 1988 Summer Olympics
Place of birth missing (living people)
Asian Games medalists in weightlifting
Weightlifters at the 1986 Asian Games
Asian Games gold medalists for South Korea
Medalists at the 1986 Asian Games
20th-century South Korean people
21st-century South Korean people